C. S. Radhadevi is a playback singer, dubbing artist, radio artist and actor from Kerala, India. Radhadevi has been in the field of Malayalam radio broadcasting for seven decades. She has sung in over thirty films in a span of 30 years. She has received many awards including Kerala Sangeetha Nataka Akademi Fellowship, Kerala Sangeetha Nataka Akademi Award, Gurupooja Award by Kerala Sangeetha Nataka Akademi, Kerala Film Critics Award and the Kerala State Film Award for her Outstanding Contribution to Malayalam Cinema.

Biography
C. S. Radhadevi was born in 1931, in Travancore, the daughter of Sivasankara Pillai and Chellamma. From a young age she was interested in dance and music. Radhadevi's first gurus were Vaikom Mani Iyer and Iraniyal Thankappan. She learned Carnatic music from Ramanatha Bhagavathar of Madras. She later studied music at the Thycaud Music Academy for one year.

Personal life
Radhadevi and her husband N. Narayanan Nair, who was a University Assistant Registrar, have one son N. Nandagopan. She is currently staying at Malikappurakkal house on Uppalam Road, Pulimoottil, Thiruvananthapuram.

Career
Radhadevi started acting at the age of 13 in a play by T. N. Gopinathan Nair. Her father Sivasankara Pillai initially opposed her acting. In 1944, she acted as a child actress in the films Yachakamohini and Ambikapathy (Tamil). She also acted and danced in Yachakamohini. In 1948, she acted as the second heroine in the film Stree starring Thikkurissy Sukumaran Nair. Later she played the lead role in the play Ballatha Pahayan directed by actor Bahadur.

Radhadevi has been active in the field of playback singing since the early days of Malayalam cinema. Thirunayinarkurichi Madhavan Nair brought Radhadevi to playback singing. She first sang with Yesudas' father Augustine Joseph in a song by Dakshinamurthy in the 1950 film Nallathanka. She has sung in over thirty films in a span of 30 years. 

Radhadevi has been in the field of Malayalam radio broadcasting for seven decades. She started conducting musical programs in the Travancore radio station in 1942 and joined All India Radio in 1950 as an artist. While working in All India Radio, Radhadevi has entered the dubbing industry and has lent her voice in Malayalam, Tamil and Telugu films. As a dubbing artist, she first voiced for a child actress in the film Vanamala (1951) directed by G. Viswanath. Her first dubbing for a heroine was in the film Jnanasundari (1961).

Awards and honours
In 1983, Radhamani received the Kerala Sangeetha Nataka Akademi Award. In 2018, she was honoured with the Kerala Sangeetha Nataka Akademi Fellowship. She also received many other awards including Gurupooja Award by Kerala Sangeetha Nataka Akademi, Kerala Film Critics Award, the Tagore Jayanti Award, the Kerala State Film Award for Outstanding Contribution to Malayalam Cinema, the Natyagriham Award, TR Sukumaran Nair Memorial Award, Swathithirunal Sangeethasabha Award, Swaram Award, Bharathiyakalapeedam Sangeeta Samgama Puraskaram and the All India Radio Award for service of 60 Years.

References

1931 births
Living people
Singers from Kerala
20th-century Indian singers
Indian women playback singers
Kerala State Film Award winners
Malayalam playback singers
Singers from Thiruvananthapuram
Film musicians from Kerala
20th-century Indian women singers
Women musicians from Kerala
Recipients of the Kerala Sangeetha Nataka Akademi Fellowship
Recipients of the Kerala Sangeetha Nataka Akademi Award